Lippstadt is a town in North Rhine-Westphalia, Germany. It is the largest town within the district of Soest. Lippstadt is situated about 60 kilometres east of Dortmund, 40 kilometres south of Bielefeld and 30 kilometres west of Paderborn.

Geography
Lippstadt is situated in the Lippe valley, roughly 70 kilometres east of Dortmund and roughly 30 kilometres west of Paderborn. The historic town centre is situated between several branches of the river Lippe.

Neighbouring municipalities

Division of the town
Lippstadt consists of 18 districts:

History
Lippstadt was founded in 1168 by Bernhard II zur Lippe. 
In the early 13th century Lippstadt, with a population of 2700, had four parish churches. There was an Augustinian abbey which had existed since 1281.

From 1400, the enclave and town of Lippstadt were to be a condominium shared by the county of Lippe and the counts of Cleves-Mark, who were succeeded by the Hohenzollerns (Brandenburg/Prussia), a situation that endured until the middle of the 19th. century.

Heinrich von Ahaus founded one of his communities for women of the Brethren of the Common Life there.

In 1523 it formed a defensive alliance together with the neighbouring cities of Osnabrück, Dortmund, Soest and Münster.

Augustinians studying at the University of Wittenberg brought Martin Luther's doctrine home with them. Thus in 1524 Lutheran doctrines were preached at Lippstadt by their prior Westermann, and the town was one of the first to embrace Lutheranism officially, though it resisted the rise of Calvinism in rural areas of Westphalia.

Colonel Edward Morgan, (c. 1616 – after 1665), a Royalist during English Civil War 1642–1649, was Captain General of the Kings (Charles I) forces in South Wales. After the King's arrest and execution, he fled to the continent, and married Anna Petronilla the daughter of Baron von Pöllnitz from Westphalia, Governor of Lippstadt. They had six children, two sons, and four daughters. He was later appointed Lieutenant Governor of Jamaica 1664–65. His nephew Henry Morgan left his Jamaican property to his godsons Charles Byndloss (b.1668) and Henry Archbold on condition they adopted the surname of Morgan. These were the children of his two cousins Anna Petronilla Byndloss (née Morgan), and Johanna Archbold (née Morgan).

In 1821 the Papal Bull "De salute animarum", made over to the Bishopric of Paderborn the Lippian parishes of Cappel, Lipperode and Lippstadt, which had previously belonged to the Archbishopric of Cologne without producing any ensuing agreement with the state of Lippe.

In 1851 the whole of Lippstadt, which up to then had been divided between the Kingdom of Prussia and Lippe, was added to the Prussian royal province of Westphalia.

In 1944 a women's subcamp of Buchenwald was founded in Lippstadt. It was also the site of a displaced persons camp in the years following World War II. On 1 April 1945 the US 2nd Armored Division made contact with the 3rd Armored Division at Lippstadt, effecting junction of the US Ninth Army with the US First Army, and seized the city from scattered resistance.

Economy
Lippstadt serves as headquarters of international automotive supplier's Hella and HBPO Group. It is also home to a factory of large-diameter antifriction bearings, seamless-rolled rings manufacturer Rothe Erde.

Transport

Road Transport
The important road to get to Lippstadt is the Bundesstraße 55. This street goes from north to south of the city. At north, Lippstadt connects with Rheda-Wiedenbrück and the Autobahn 2 (Dortmund-Hannover). Southwards it connects with the Bundesstraße 1 and the Autobahn 44 (Dortmund-Kassel) by passing through the town of Erwitte.

Rail Transport
The Lippstadt train station (Bahnhof Lippstadt) lies on the Hamm-Warburg railway. It has a railway service with ICE, IC and region train. Passengers can change direction with Kassel, Dresden, München and Düsseldorf networks.

Region Train Networks
 RE 1,Nordrhein-Westfalen-Express, comes from Parderborn through Ruhrgebiet region and Düsseldorf, and it also passes Cologne and end up at Aachen station.
 RB 89,Ems-Börde-Bahn, takes only 30 minutes to Hamm-Münster

BUS
The bus system in Lippstadt is provided by Regionalverkehr Ruhr-Lippe (RLG). The system consists of 3 major types of bus networks.
City-Bus Networks

The city-bus networks
The city-bus networks in Lippstadt consist of five lines (C1-C5). The bus lines start every 30 minutes from Bustreff am Bahnhof and travel via five different routes to different destinations. 
 C1: From Bustreff am Bahnhof to Wohnpark Süd - Landsberger Rd	
 C2: From Bustreff am Bahnhof to Pappelallee - Landsberger Rd.
 C3 : From Bustreff am Bahnhof to Cappel	
 C4 : From Bustreff am Bahnhof to Lipperbruch
 C5 : From Bustreff am Bahnhof to Lipperode

Region-Bus Networks
The City-Bus Network does not provide coverage in some areas. However, passengers can use Region-Bus Networks instant. Region-Bus Networks, a bus network providing transportation between cities, has individual timetables and destinations. The regular service Region-buses (S60, R61-64, R66, R73, 70 and 80.1) covers Beakum, Rheda-Wiedenbrück and Rietberg. In addition, there is the Schnellbus from Lippstadt passing through Erwitte to Warstein every hour.

Bus at the weekend
On the weekend, there are a few buses in the evening so passengers have to use Nachtbusse or Anrufsammeltaxis which passengers have to call before travelling.

Airport
The nearest airport from Lippstadt is Paderborn/Lippstadt Airport. The airport is located in Büren-Ahden. They do not have direct public transport from Lippstadt to the airport. However, passengers can catch the RE1 train to Paderborn Hbf and then go to the terminal by Schnellbus S60 from Paderborn Hbf.

Twin towns – sister cities

Lippstadt is twinned with:
 Uden, Netherlands (1971)

Notable people
David Gans (1541–1613), Jewish mathematician, historian, astronomer and astrologer
Kaspar Ulenberg (1549–1617), Catholic convert, theological writer and translator of the Bible
Anton Praetorius (1560–1613), theologian, fighter against witchcraft trials and torture
Burghard Freiherr von Schorlemer-Alst (1825–1895), politician
Anthony Eickhoff (1827–1901), German-American author and politician
Rudolph Blankenburg (1843–1918), American businessman, manufacturer and mayor of Philadelphia, studied in Lippstadt
Otto Steinbrinck (1888–1949), industrialist and WW1 U-boat commander
Martin Niemöller (1892–1984), theologian
Conrad Hansen (1906–2002), classical pianist 
Karl-Heinz Rummenigge (born 1955), footballer

References

External links
 
 
Touristic information
Rail transport information
Rail ticket information

Soest (district)